Batman: Dying Is Easy is a 2021 superhero fan film directed by Aaron and Sean Schoenke, based on the Batman franchise. It stars Kevin Porter as Batman and Aaron Schoenke as The Joker. The film is the third Batman fan film by the Schoenke brothers after City of Scars (2010) and Seeds of Arkham (2011).

Batman: Dying Is Easy was crowdfunded through Indiegogo and uploaded on YouTube on March 11, 2021.

Plot
While investigating the disappearance of three Gotham City Police officers, Batman raids the Mad Hatter's hideout and rescues a girl forced to dress as Alice. Two months later, he is informed by Lieutenant Harvey Bullock that The Joker is dying and wishes to see him.

Upon Batman's arrival at Arkham Asylum, the Joker tells him he is suffering from melanoma due to his chemical accident, and he wants Batman to kill him as a fitting end to his legacy. Batman walks away, but the Joker taunts him by reminding him of the death of Jason Todd and the crippling of Barbara Gordon. An enraged Batman wraps a chain around the Joker's neck and hangs him, telling him how irrelevant he has become as a criminal. With nothing left to say, the Joker confesses to murdering the three missing officers and leaving their bodies at O'Neil's Toyland. Batman lets go of the Joker, revealing that he made him confess by falsifying his toxicology report and poisoning his water supply for weeks to make him believe he had a terminal illness. In addition, Batman knew the Joker was responsible for the disappearance of the officers when he discovered a police baton with the Joker's fingerprints on it during his raid on the Mad Hatter's hideout.

As Gotham City Police recovers the corpses of the missing officers, Bullock confronts Batman over being manipulated during the Dark Knight's investigation. Before disappearing from Bullock's presence, Batman reveals that the officers were already dead from the beginning, but did not disclose that fact to take away hope so their families could heal and move on.

Cast
 Kevin Porter as Bruce Wayne / Batman
 Aaron Schoenke as The Joker
 Michael Madsen as Lieutenant Harvey Bullock
 Doug Jones as the Riddler
 Chris Daughtry as Hugo Strange
 Jamie Costa as Mad Hatter
 Vera Bambi as Poison Ivy
 Amy Johnston as Harley Quinn
 Tatiana Neva as Selina Kyle / Catwoman
 Mike Estes as Mr. Freeze
 Lionel Washington III as Killer Croc
 Guy Grundy as Victor Zsasz
 Orion Acaba as Condiment King
 Amanda Lynne Shafer as Barbara Gordon
 Chalet Lizette Brannan as Little Alice
 Casper Van Dien as Commissioner James Gordon
 Jennifer Wenger as Summer Gleeson

References

External links
 
 

2021 films
2021 action films
2021 independent films
2021 short films
2020s American films
2020s English-language films
2020s superhero films
American action films
American independent films
Crowdfunded films
Fan films based on Batman
Films released on YouTube
Films set in psychiatric hospitals
Films shot in Los Angeles